The Azm Movement is a political party in Lebanon, founded and led by Prime Minister of Lebanon Najib Miqati and has 0 members in parliament.

As of 2018 Haitham Ezzedine served as coordinator of the Azm Movement in Akkar.

History 
The Azm Movement participated in the parliamentary elections of 2000 and 2009 by nominating its leader, Najib Mikati, in the Tripoli constituency, for the Sunni seat, and was able to win both times.

The party participated in the 2018 parliamentary elections in the Minnieh, Dinnieh, Tripoli electoral district, which was conducted according to the new proportional system, and announced the formation of a list called "List of Determination",  which achieved a great victory and ranked second in Tripoli with more than 40,000 votes. and the party won four seats:

Najib Mikati for the Sunni seat; Ali Darwish for the Alawite seat; Jean Obeid for the Maronite seat and Nicolas Nahas for the Eastern Orthodox seat. Jean Obeid died during his term in 2021.

References

External links
Party website

2004 establishments in Lebanon
Political parties established in 2004
Political parties in Lebanon
Secularism in Lebanon